Briana Rae Sparrey (born August 25, 1992), better known by the ring name Kylie Rae, is an American professional wrestler. She is also known for her time in All Elite Wrestling and Impact Wrestling.

Early life
Sparrey graduated from Oak Forest High School in 2010 where she played softball.

Before becoming a full-time professional wrestler, Sparrey also worked as a stuntwoman, performing stunts for the film Divergent and the TV series Shameless.

Professional wrestling career

Independent wrestling (2016–present)
Rae made her professional wrestling debut at a March 19, 2016 Reality of Wrestling TV taping, defeating Ivory Robin to win the ROW Diamonds Championship. Rae received a tryout with WWE in February 2018.

On January 5, 2019, at Warrior Wrestling 3, Rae challenged Jordynne Grace for the Progress World Women's Championship but was defeated.

On September 21, 2019, Rae made her return to Freelance Wrestling, defeating Isaias Velazquez.  On September 12, 2020, Rae defeated Tessa Blanchard to win the Warrior Wrestling Women's Championship.

Kylie Rae returned to pro wrestling on June 5, 2021, defeating Holidead at Warrior Wrestling's Stadium Series in Chicago, Illinois. She lost Warrior Wrestling Women's Championship to Thunder Rosa on August 21, 2021.  Rae made her UK debut for Revolution Pro Wrestling on May 22, 2022, where she was defeated by Alex Windsor for the Undisputed British Women's Championship.  She made her New Japan Pro-Wrestling debut at Rumble on 44th Street on October 28, 2022, where she teamed with Tiara James and defeated Mina Shirakawa and Waka Tsukiyama.

All Elite Wrestling (2019)
In early 2019, Rae became part of the women's roster at All Elite Wrestling (AEW). She debuted in the promotion's inaugural event, Double or Nothing, in a match with Britt Baker, Awesome Kong, and Nyla Rose in a losing effort. Rae was advertised to compete against Leva Bates at Fyter Fest, however she was replaced by Allie. During a media scrum after All Out, Tony Khan announced that Rae had requested her release which was subsequently granted, and that the split was "very amicable".

Impact Wrestling (2019–2021)
On October 20, 2019, Rae made a surprise appearance at Impact Wrestling's Bound For Glory pay-per-view. She entered #17 in the "Call Your Shot" Gauntlet Match and was eliminated by Mahabali Shera. On March 6, 2020, Rae defeated Cassandra Golden as part of Impact Wrestling's TV tapings in Atlanta. On the March 31 episode of Impact!, it was announced that Rae had signed a long-term deal with Impact Wrestling. Rae defeated Kiera Hogan during Night 1 of Rebellion on April 21. On the May 26 episode of Impact!, she aligned herself with Susie after they were bullied and beaten up by Hogan and Tasha Steelz, leading to a tag team match the next week, where they lost after Hogan pinned Susie with a swinging fisherman suplex.

On July 18 at Slammiversary, Rae won a Gauntlet for the Gold match to become #1 contender to the Impact Knockouts Championship. On the July 28 episode of Impact!, she joined a bunch of wrestlers in the reality show Wrestle House. During that time, Rae got into a feud with Rosemary and Taya Valkyrie, beating them in singles matches on the August 4 episode of Impact! and Night 1 of Emergence on August 18 respectively. On the September 1 episode of Impact!, she and the rest of the Wrestle House cast returned to the Impact Zone during Knockouts Champion Deonna Purrazzo's Black Tie Affair, attacking Kimber Lee who was stopped by Susie. During the following weeks, Rae feuded with the Knockout Champion Deonna Purrazzo leading to their scheduled match at Bound for Glory. However, Rae  didn't appear at the event and was replaced by Su Yung. Two weeks later, she announced her retirement from pro wrestling. However, Rae would return to wrestling a few months later with National Wrestling Alliance, being allowed by Impact.

National Wrestling Alliance (2021–2022) 
On June 6, 2021, Rae and Taryn Terrell defeated Thunder Rosa and Melina Perez at NWA When Our Shadows Fall.  It was announced that Kylie Rae had signed a contract with the National Wrestling Alliance (NWA). Rae made her NWA singles debut on the June 29 episode of NWA Powerrr, defeating Melina Perez.  Rae lost to Mickie James at NWA 73 by pinfall.  Rae was part of a three-way NWA World Women's Championship match at the 2022 Crockett Cup but was pinned by Kamille.

WWE (2022–present) 
In December, Sparrey attended a week long WWE tryout in Orlando. This marked her second successful tryout with the company with her first one taking place in February 2018. During the tryout she worked 2 matches against current NXT talents, Fallon Henley and Thea Hail. She also made her official WWE in ring debut under the name Briana Ray on the December 15 episode of WWE Main Event, losing to Dana Brooke.

In addition to her appearance on Main Event, Sparrey would occasionally be brought back in by the company to work as an extra.

Personal life
Sparrey is engaged to fellow professional wrestler Isaiah Velazquez.

Championships and accomplishments
 AAW Wrestling
 AAW Women's Championship (1 time)
 Black Label Pro
 BLP Midwest Championship (1 time)
 Brew City Wrestling
 BCW Ladies Championship (1 time)
 Capital Wrestling Alliance
 CWA Championship (1 time)
 Raven Black Memorial Tournament
 Freelance Wrestling
 Freelance World Championship (2 times)
 Impact Wrestling
 Gauntlet for the Gold (2020 – Knockouts)
 Making Towns Wrestling (MTW)
 Making Towns Classic Tournament
 Rise Wrestling
 Phoenix of Rise Championship (1 time)
 Rise Year-End Award (1 time)
 Match of the Year (2019) 
 Pro Wrestling Illustrated
 Ranked No. 19 of the top 100 female wrestlers in the PWI Women's 100 in 2020
 Ranked No. 78 of the top 500 wrestlers in the PWI 500 in 2020
 Reality of Wrestling
 ROW Diamonds Division Championship (3 times)
 Sabotage Wrestling
 War of the Genders Championship (1 time)
 Warrior Wrestling
 WW Women's Championship (1 time)
 Zelo Pro Wrestling
 Zelo Pro Women's Championship (2 times)

References

External links 

 
 
 

1992 births
American female professional wrestlers
American stunt performers
Governors State University alumni
Living people
Professional wrestlers from Illinois
Sportspeople from Chicago
21st-century American women
21st-century professional wrestlers
AAW Women's Champions